Hartsville is a populated place situated at the crossroads of Bristol Road and the Old York Road, straddling Warminster and Warwick Township in Bucks County, Pennsylvania, United States. It is served by the Warminster Post Office ZIP code of 18974.

Hartsville was named for Colonel William Hart, who served during the Revolutionary War. He relocated to the village in the late 1700s and opened a new inn which he called "The Sign of the Hart."

Hartville was the name of the station stop on the Pennsylvania Northeastern Railroad, later renamed Ivyland.

A Presbyterian church was located in Hartsville from 1839 until 1939, when it merged with another church and the Hartsville building was torn down. The church had its own cemetery.

Metropolitan Museum of Art's collection includes an 1843 cut-paper silhouette portrait of a Hartsville resident identified as Mrs. James P. Wilson.

The Hartsville Fire Company is site of a 9/11 memorial.

In 2019, water from private wells in the community was reportedly unsafe to drink because of contamination by per- and polyfluoroalkyl substances (PFAS)  chemicals, possibly from toxic  waste from closed military facilities nearby.

References

Populated places in Bucks County, Pennsylvania